King Dao may refer to these monarchs of ancient China:

King Dao of Zhou (died 520 BC)
King Dao of Chu (died 381 BC)

See also
Duke Dao (disambiguation)